The Samuel George House is a historic house in Louisville, Tennessee, U.S.. It was built with slave labor circa 1815 for Samuel George, a farmer. By 1978, it still belonged to the George family. It has been listed on the National Register of Historic Places since January 27, 1982.

References

Houses on the National Register of Historic Places in Tennessee
Houses completed in 1815
Buildings and structures in Blount County, Tennessee